Edward Brayley may refer to:

 Edward William Brayley (1801–1870), English geographer, librarian, and science author
 Edward Wedlake Brayley (1773–1854), English antiquary and topographer